German submarine U-575 was a Type VIIC U-boat in service of Nazi Germany's Kriegsmarine during World War II. She was a member of 18 separate wolfpacks and was sunk north of the Azores by Allied ships and aircraft on 13 March 1944.

Design
German Type VIIC submarines were preceded by the shorter Type VIIB submarines. U-575 had a displacement of  when at the surface and  while submerged. She had two shafts and two  propellers.

U-575 was fitted with five  torpedo tubes (four fitted at the bow and one at the stern), fourteen torpedoes, one  SK C/35 naval gun, 220 rounds, and a  C/30 anti-aircraft gun. The boat had a complement of between forty-four and sixty.

Service history
The submarine was laid down on 1 August 1940 at Blohm & Voss, Hamburg, as yard number 551. She was launched on 30 April 1941 and commissioned on 19 June under the command of Kapitänleutnant Günther Heydemann.

She served with the 7th U-boat Flotilla until her loss (from 1 September 1941 until 13 March 1944).

First patrol
U-575s first patrol was from Trondheim in Norway; she headed for the Atlantic Ocean via the gap between Iceland and the Faroe Islands. She swept an area southeast of Greenland and sank the Tuva on 2 October 1941. The ship's crew abandoned their vessel in a pair of lifeboats and two rafts, but had to leave one of their number who had been trapped underneath debris. The neutral US destroyer , escorting convoy ON 20, came to help Tuva. As Winslow reached the area, she closed in on U-575 and began the tracing with depth charges, but U-575 escaped without any damage.

The submarine was the target of an air attack on 7 October, but received minimal damage. She arrived at St. Nazaire in occupied France, on 9 October.

Statistics
 Days on sea: 32
 Overall distance travelled: 5,059.5 nmi
 Distance travelled surfaced: 4,776.70 nmi (94.4%)
 Distance travelled submerged: 282.8 nmi (5.6%)
 Most distance travelled in 24 hours surfaced: 292 nmi (on 08.10.1941)
 Most distance travelled in 24 hours submerged: 36.3 nmi (on 12.09.1941)
 Total diving time: 7,029 minutes; 117.15 hours; 4.88 days (15.3%)

Second patrol
Having left St. Nazaire on 9 November 1941, U-575 headed for the Newfoundland and Labrador coast.

On 1 December 1941 she encountered the American tanker Astral at 35°40´N/24°00´W (ca. grid square CF75-79). The tanker had departed Aruba in Venezuela, and sailed to Lissabon with a cargo of 78,200 barrels of benzine and kerosine. For many hours, U-575 hunted Astral so that she could come into a good firing position; after doing so, Captain Heydemann recognized the neutral US flag, and refrained from attacking the tanker.

On the return leg, when U-575 was looking to re-fuel at Vigo, Spain, she was depth charged. The damage was serious enough to prevent her entry into the Mediterranean; she was obliged to return to St. Nazaire, which she did on 17 December.

Statistics
 Days on sea: 39
 Overall distance travelled: 5,814 nmi
 Distance travelled surfaced: 5,508.80 nmi (94.8%)
 Distance travelled submerged: 305.2 nmi (5.2%)
 Most distance travelled in 24 hours surfaced: 354 nmi (on 30.11.1941)
 Most distance travelled in 24 hours submerged: 37 nmi (on 10.12.1941)
 Total diving time: 6,841 minutes; 114.02 hours; 4.75 days (12.2%)

Third patrol
For her third foray, U-575 left St. Nazaire on 14 January 1942. On the 25th, a lookout broke an arm in bad weather.

On the 31st, U-123 met U-575, but there was no sign of the Spreewald. She had been sunk, but it was not then known by whom.

Statistics
 Days on sea: 44
 Overall distance travelled: 5,986 nmi
 Distance travelled surfaced: 5,750 nmi (96.1%)
 Distance travelled submerged: 236 nmi (3.9%)
 Most distance travelled in 24 hours surfaced: 210 nmi (on 27.01.1942)
 Most distance travelled in 24 hours submerged: 24 nmi (on 16.01.1942)
 Total diving time: 3,369 minutes; 56.15 hours; 2.34 days (5.3%)

Fourth patrol

Statistics
 Days on sea: 52
 Overall distance travelled: 7,129.5 nmi
 Distance travelled surfaced: 6,912 nmi (97%)
 Distance travelled submerged: 217.5 nmi (3%)
 Most distance travelled in 24 hours surfaced: 268 nmi (on 28.03.1942)
 Most distance travelled in 24 hours submerged: 37,5 nmi (on 26.03.1942)
 Total diving time: 5,622 minutes; 93.7 hours; 3.90 days (7.4%)

Fifth patrol
U-575 performed a steady stream of sinkings on her fifth sortie. Additionally, she sunk two sailing ships (Comrade and Glacier) with gunfire on the 18th.

She also damaged San Gaspar off Manzilla, Trinidad on the 18th. It was assumed at that time that this ship had been sunk, but she was taken in tow by the tug  to Port of Spain, repaired, and returned to service in October 1943.

Statistics
 Days on sea: 59
 Overall distance travelled: 10,173 nmi
 Distance travelled surfaced 9,732.30 nmi (95.7%)
 Distance travelled submerged: 440.7 nmi (4.3%)
 Most distance travelled in 24 hours surfaced: 286.1 nmi (on 14.06.1942)
 Most distance travelled in 24 hours submerged: 57 nmi (on 06.08.1942)
 Total diving time: 9,866 minutes; 164.4 hours; 6.85 days (11.6%)

Sixth patrol
On the boat's sixth patrol, a man was lost overboard on 5 October 1942.

Abossos top speed was only  and therefore normally sailed only in convoys. One passenger, Dutch Navy submarine commander Lieutenant ter zee der 1e klasse H.C.J. Coumou had warned against this but the British authorities overruled him.
On board were 162 crew, 20 DEMS gunners to defend the ship and 210 passengers. The passengers were 149 military, 44 internees and 17 civilians, including 10 women with children. The cargo was 3,000 tons of wool and mailbags. Among the military passengers were 44 newly trained pilots of the 23rd Service Flying Training School in Southern Rhodesia and 34 Dutch submariners on their way to crew the submarine Hr. Ms. Haai, which was then under construction. The British authorities therefore reallocated the submarine again, and she was launched as the Norwegian Navy .

Statistics
 Days on sea: 54
 Overall distance travelled: 7,363.4 nmi
 Distance travelled surfaced: 6,903.10 nmi (93.8%)
 Distance travelled submerged: 460.3 nmi (6.2%)
 Most distance travelled in 24 hours surfaced: 300 nmi (on 04.10.1942)
 Most distance travelled in 24 hours submerged: 53 nmi (on 23.09.1942)
 Total diving time: 7,587 minutes; 126.5 hours; 5.27 days (9.8%)

Seventh patrol

Statistics

 Days on sea: 64
 Overall distance travelled: 10,132.3 nmi
 Distance travelled surfaced: 9,692.70 nmi (95.7%)
 Distance travelled submerged: 439.6 nmi (4.3%)
 Most distance travelled in 24 hours surfaced: 294.8 nmi (on 09.01.1943)
 Most distance travelled in 24 hours submerged: 40.7 nmi (on 20.12.1942)
 Total diving time: 10,449 minutes; 174.2 hours; 7.26 days (10.8%)

Eight patrol
Her eighth sortie, which commenced on 22 April 1943 and finished on 11 June, was relatively uneventful.

Statistics
 Days on sea: 51
 Overall distance travelled: 8,028.7 nmi
 Distance travelled surfaced: 7,164.90 nmi (89.2%)
 Distance travelled submerged: 863.8 nmi (10.8%)
 Most distance travelled in 24 hours surfaced: 307 nmi (on 14.05.1943)
 Most distance travelled in 24 hours submerged: 53.3 nmi (on 26.04.1943)
 Total diving time: 17,217 minutes; 287 hours; 11.96 days (23.4%)

Ninth patrol
U-575 had a new Captain, Oberleutnant zur See Wolfgang Boehmer, since September 1943, in time for her ninth patrol.

The expedition was split into four parts; the first three were only a couple of days' duration. The fourth was longer and included an approach by a B-24 Liberator which turned away when engaged by the U-boat's anti-aircraft guns. Nevertheless, she crash-dived.

Statistics
 Days on sea: 63
 Overall distance travelled: 6,776.2 nmi
 Distance travelled surfaced: 5,432.80 nmi (80.2%)
 Distance travelled submerged: 1,343.4 nmi (19.8%)
 Most distance travelled in 24 hours surfaced: 263.1 nmi (on 16.11.1943)
 Most distance travelled in 24 hours submerged: 54 nmi (on 09.10.1943)
 Total diving time: 36,392 minutes; 606.5 hours; 25.27 days (36.1%)

Tenth patrol and loss

U-575 was fitted with a Snorkel. On this journey she was used as weather-boat.
U-575 left St. Nazaire for the last time on 29 February 1944.

Depth charges were used in the attack.

18 men died with U-575; there were 37 survivors.

Wolfpacks
U-575 took part in 18 wolfpacks, namely:
 Brandenburg (15 – 26 September 1941) 
 Steuben (14 November – 2 December 1941) 
 Endrass (12 – 17 June 1942) 
 Tiger (26 – 27 September 1942) 
 Luchs (27 September – 6 October 1942) 
 Panther (6 – 16 October 1942) 
 Puma (16 – 22 October 1942) 
 Delphin (26 December 1942 – 14 February 1943) 
 Amsel 1 (3 – 6 May 1943) 
 Elbe (7 – 10 May 1943) 
 Elbe 1 (10 – 14 May 1943) 
 Mosel (19 – 24 May 1943) 
 Siegfried (22 – 27 October 1943) 
 Siegfried 3 (27 – 30 October 1943) 
 Jahn (30 October – 2 November 1943) 
 Tirpitz 3 (2 – 8 November 1943) 
 Eisenhart 4 (9 – 15 November 1943) 
 Preussen (2 – 13 March 1944)

Summary of raiding history

References

Notes

Citations

Bibliography

External links

 private Homepage about U-575 

German Type VIIC submarines
U-boats commissioned in 1941
U-boats sunk in 1944
U-boats sunk by British aircraft
U-boats sunk by depth charges
U-boats sunk by US warships
U-boats sunk by Canadian warships
1941 ships
Ships built in Hamburg
World War II submarines of Germany
Maritime incidents in March 1944